David Joseph Campbell  (born 6 August 1973) is an Australian singer, actor, and TV personality. He is the son of singer Jimmy Barnes.

Career

Theatre career
Campbell began working professionally in Australia in 1993, after extensive training in youth theatre, during which he won an Australia Day award for his contribution to youth stars. Campbell attracted attention in Sydney with his role in the hit Australian play Relative Merits. 

In 1995 Campbell starred in the revival of Alex Harding's musical, Only Heaven Knows, for which he was nominated for a MO Award for Best Musical Theatre Performer of the Year. 

In 1997, Campbell travelled to New York and performed in the Tony Award-winning Love! Valor! Compassion!.

Campbell appeared in Les Misérables in the role of Marius Campell won the MO Award for Best Featured Actor in a Musical and New York Backstage Bistro Award as Outstanding Vocalist of the Year. 

Campbell also performed in South Pacific, Guys and Dollsand in Hey, Mr. Producer!. In 2000, he provided the singing voice for the character Joseph in DreamWorks' animated film Joseph: King of Dreams.

In 2001, Campbell appeared in the Australian musical Shout! The Legend of The Wild One, the story of rocker Johnny O'Keefe. Since 2001 he has made occasional stage appearances in Australia, in musicals such as Carousel, Sunset Boulevard, and Company.  His performance in Sunset Boulevard earned Campbell the award for Best Male Actor in a Musical at the 6th Helpmann Awards.

In 2016, Campbell appeared in Dream Lover - The Bobby Darin Musical. A cast recording was released in September 2016 by Sony Music Australia, featuring Campbell. It debuted at number 9 on the ARIA Charts.  For Dream Lover, Campbell received his second Helpmann Award for Best Male Actor in a Musical.

Theatre awards/nominations

Recording career
In 1997, Campbell released his debut album, Yesterday is Now. This was followed with his second album in the same year, Taking the Wheel.

In 2006, Campbell released The Swing Sessions.

In 2008, David released Good Lovin', an album of songs from the 1960s. A live DVD of the accompanying Good Lovin' Live tour hit number one on the Australian DVD chart.

Campbell's album, On Broadway was released in January 2010. On Broadway was released in Australia on 2 April 2010, with a tie-in television documentary David Campbell On Broadway airing on arts channel STVDIO the following day.

On 18 November 2011, an album of early 1980s music called Let's Go was released in Australia.

In June 2014, David released David Campbell Sings John Bucchino, recorded in Australia in May 2014 featuring John Bucchino playing piano.

In the Australian and New Zealand version of Disney's 2016 animated film Zootopia, Campbell voices a Koala news anchor.

In September 2016, had a role in Dream Lover: The Bobby Darin Musical in Sydney.

In April 2019, Campbell released Back in the Swing.

In September 2021, Campbell will release his eleventh studio album, The Saturday Sessions, featuring his take on songs that have shaped his life and career regardless of genre or era.

Television and radio
Campbell was a contestant on the third season of Dancing with the Stars. He has also featured on two series of the celebrity singing competition It Takes Two. He won the second series in 2007, with celebrity partner Jolene Anderson. 
 
Campbell appeared on Hey Hey It's Saturday, and co-hosted The Morning Show with Kylie Gillies occasionally when Larry Emdur was away.

Campbell is currently co-host of Today Extra (formerly Mornings with Sylvia Jefferys on the Nine Network.

In 2011, Campbell performed at Carols in the Domain in Sydney.

In 2013, Campbell was announced as co-host of Vision Australia's Carols by Candlelight with Sonia Kruger.

In January 2019, Campbell was appointed co-host of Weekend Today replacing Peter Stefanovic. He remained in the position until December 2019. It was announced that in 2020, Campbell would host Today Extra full time with Richard Wilkins replacing him on Weekend Today.

In April 2020, Campbell hosted Music from the Home Front, a music concert recorded from musicians homes and broadcast on network 9 during the COVID-19 pandemic.
Campbell started on smoothfm in May 2012. He is currently the host of weekend Afternoons (1pm - 4pm) on smoothfm 91.5 in Melbourne and smoothfm 95.3 in Sydney.

Adelaide Cabaret Festival
Campbell was appointed Artistic Director of the Adelaide Cabaret Festival in 2008, and his programming began with the June 2009 festival. The 2011 Cabaret Festival was his last as Artistic Director.

Personal life
Campbell is the son of Cold Chisel frontman and singer Jimmy Barnes. He was raised by his maternal grandmother and believed, until he was about ten years old, that his grandmother was his mother and his actual mother was his sister.

After he reunited with his father Jimmy Barnes the two performed together on numerous occasions, including on an episode of Dancing with the Stars and at Carols by Candlelight. Both father and son have recorded duets for each other's studio albums.

Campbell married British producer Lisa Hewitt in 2008 and they have three children together.

Discography

Studio albums

Original Cast albums

Compilation albums

DVDs
{|class="wikitable plainrowheaders" style="text-align:center;" border="1"
|-
! scope="col" rowspan="2"| Title
! scope="col" rowspan="2"| Details
! scope="col" colspan="1"| Peak chart positions
! scope="col" rowspan="2"| Certifications(thresholds)
|-
! scope="col" style="width:3em;font-size:85%;"| AUS
|-
! scope="row" | Good Lovin' Live
|
Released: April 2009
Label: Sony Music Australia 
Format: DVD
| 1
|
 ARIA: Platinum
|-
! scope="row" | Keep On Lovin'''
|
Released: November 2009
Label: Sony Music Australia 
Format: DVD
| 15
| 
|-
! scope="row" | The Broadway Show|
Released: November 2010
Label: Sony Music Australia 
Format: DVD
| -
| 
|}

Singles
{| class="wikitable plainrowheaders" style="text-align:center;"
|+List of singles, with year released, Australian chart positions and album name shown
! scope="col" rowspan="2"| Title
! scope="col" rowspan="2"| Year
! scope="col" colspan="1"| Peak chart positions
! scope="col" rowspan="2"| Album
|-
! scope="col" style="width:3em;font-size:90%;"| AUS
|-
! scope="row"| "Hope"
| rowspan="2"| 2003
| 8
| rowspan="3" 
|-
! scope="row"| "When She's Gone"
| 25
|-
! scope="row"| "End of the World"
| 2005
| 47
|-
! scope="row"| "Mack The Knife"
| 2006
| —
| The Swing Sessions|-
! scope="row"| "Perhaps, Perhaps, Perhaps"
| 2007
| —
| The Swing Sessions 2|-
! scope="row"| "You've Lost That Lovin' Feelin'"  (with Jimmy Barnes)
| 2008
| —
| Good Lovin|-
! scope="row"| "Tainted Love"
| 2011
| —
| rowspan="3"| Let's Go
|-
! scope="row"| "Shout to the Top"
| rowspan="2"| 2012
| —
|-
! scope="row"| "Come On Eileen"
| —
|-
! scope="row"| "What You Need"
| rowspan="2"| 2014
| —
| David Campbell Sings John Bucchino
|-
! scope="row"| "Falling Slowly"  (with Kate Ceberano)
| —
| 
|-
! scope="row"| "Total Eclipse of the Heart" (live)  (with Sylvia Jeffreys featuring The Australian Girls Choir)
| 2017
| —
| 
|-
! scope="row"| "I Can't Help Myself (Sugar Pie Honey Bunch)"
| 2019
| —
| Back in the Swing
|-
! scope="row"| "Saltwater"
| 2021
| —
| The Saturday Sessions
|-
|}NotesOther appearances

Awards and nominations
ARIA Music Awards
The ARIA Music Awards is an annual awards ceremony that recognises excellence, innovation, and achievement across all genres of Australian music. They commenced in 1987. 

! 
|-
| 2001
| Shout! The Legend Of The Wild One
| Best Original Cast or Show Album
| 
|rowspan="2" | 
|-
| 2017
| Dream Lover (Australian Cast Recording featuring David Campbell)
| Best Original Soundtrack, Cast or Show Album
| 
|-

Helpmann Awards
The Helpmann Awards is an awards show, celebrating live entertainment and performing arts in Australia, presented by industry group Live Live Performance Australia (LPA') since 2001.

 
! 
|-
| 2001
| David Campbell in Shout! The Legend of the Wild One| Helpmann Award for Best Male Actor in a Musical
| 
|
|-
|rowspan="2" |  2006
| David Campbell in Sunset Boulevard 
|rowspan="2" | Helpmann Award for Best Male Actor in a Musical
| 
|
|-
| David Campbell in The 25th Annual Putnam County Spelling Bee| 
|-
|rowspan="2" |  2007
| David Campbell in Wild With Style| Helpmann Award for Best Performance in an Australian Contemporary Concert
| 
|rowspan="2" | 
|-
| David Campbell
| Best Australian Contemporary Concert
| 
|-
| 2008
| David Campbell in The Swing Sessions 2| Best Performance in an Australian Contemporary Concert
| 
| 
|-
| 2015
| David Campbell Sings John Bucchino| Helpmann Award for Best Cabaret Performer
| 
| 
|-
|rowspan="2" |  2018
| David Campbell in Dream Lover| Best Male Actor in a Musical
| 
|rowspan="2" | 
|-
| David Campbell in Assassins''
| Best Male Actor in a Musical
| 
|-

References

External links 
 
 
 
 David Campbell Official Myspace
 The Australian David Campbell Information Page

1973 births
Australian male musical theatre actors
Australian male singers
Australian people of Irish descent
Australian people of Scottish descent
Australian people of Scottish-Jewish descent
Helpmann Award winners
Male actors from Adelaide
Musicians from Adelaide
Living people
Recipients of the Medal of the Order of Australia
Singing talent show winners
Sony Music Australia artists
Swan musical family